The Yeni Mosque situated in Bitola, North Macedonia, was built in 1558 by Kadi Mahmud-efendi. It is well known for its exquisite decorative ornaments and stalactites. The glazed decorative features found on the Yeni Mosque are the only examples of their kind in the country. Today, this mosque houses an art gallery. Yeni means "new" in Turkish.

See also
Mustapha Pasha Mosque

Ottoman mosques in North Macedonia
Buildings and structures in Bitola
Tourist attractions in Bitola
Mosques completed in 1558